The Penguin English Dictionary is a one-volume English-language dictionary published by Penguin Books.  It is their flagship dictionary with over 70,000 entries, first published in 2000.

The Penguin English Dictionary is currently in its third edition, and its chief editor is Robert Allen.  The specialist contributors and advisers involve writers for books, newspapers, magazines etc.

The dictionary is also variously known as The New Penguin English Dictionary (1st edition) or The Penguin Complete English Dictionary.  The second edition was published in 2003 and the third in late 2007.

English dictionaries